Undersøkelseskommisjonen av 1945 was a commission appointed by the Parliament of Norway in 1945 and chaired by Norwegian politician Gustav Heiberg, given the task to investigate the role of the three branches of power: the Norwegian Parliament, Government and Supreme Court, as well as the Administrative Council in 1940.  The six reports with nine annexes published by the commission in 1946 and 1947, are regarded as an important source on the events in 1940.

Commission members
Gustav Adolf Lammers Heiberg (chairman)
Arne Bergsgård
Ernst Fredrik Eckhoff
Ole Hallesby
Arnold Holmboe 
Sverre Steen
Nils Nilsen Thune 
Helge Sivertsen (secretary).

Reports
I. Foreign and defence policy under Nygaardsvold's Cabinet until 7 June 1940 (with eight annexes, 1–8)
II. Administrative Council
III. Riksrådsforhandlingene (with annex 9)
IV. The Supreme Court
V. County governors and new organization of the municipalities in 1940
VI. Undertakings of the Cabinet Nygaardsvold from 7 June 1940 to 25 June 1945

Annexes
1. 
2. 
3. 
4. 
5. 
6. 
7. 
8. 
9.

References

Political history of Norway
Public inquiries
Politics of World War II
Norway in World War II